Alam Khan is an Indian actor, model and dancer. He was a part of Colors TV dance reality show Chak Dhoom Dhoom (2010). He was the first runner-up in Chhote Miyan (2012). He is best known for his roles in Kota Factory, Laakhon Mein Ek, Class of 2020 and Chaman Bahaar.

Filmography

Television

Films

Web series

References

External links

Indian male television actors
Indian people
Indian Muslims
Living people
Year of birth missing (living people)
Actors from Mumbai